Dana Ron Goldreich (b. 1964) is a computer scientist, a professor of electrical engineering at the Tel Aviv University, Israel. Prof. Ron is one of the pioneers of research in property testing, and a leading researcher in that area.

Professional career
Dana Ron obtained her B.A. (1987) and M.A. (1989) in computer science from the Hebrew University in Jerusalem.  Her Ph.D. (1995), also from the Hebrew University, was in the area of machine learning. Between the years 1995-97 she was an NSF post-doctoral fellow at the Massachusetts Institute of Technology (MIT). She was a Bunting fellow in 1997/8, and the Radcliffe fellow at Harvard University in 2003/4. Her research interests include sublinear-time algorithms (in particular property testing), randomized algorithms, and computational learning theory.

She is married to Oded Goldreich, who is also a computer scientist at the Weizmann Institute, and has collaborated with Goldreich on approximation algorithms.

Works

Books 
 D. Ron. Algorithmic and Analysis Techniques in Property Testing, Foundations and Trends in Theoretical Computer Science: vol. 5, no. 2, pages 73–205, 2009.
 D. Ron. Property Testing: A Learning Theory Perspective, Foundations and Trends in Machine Learning: vol. 1, no. 3, pages 307–402, 2008.

Selected publications
 N. Alon, S. Dar, M. Parnas, and D. Ron, Testing of Clustering. SIAM Review, vol. 46, no. 2, pages 285–308, 2004.
 O. Goldreich, S. Goldwasser and D. Ron, Property Testing and its connection to Learning and Approximation. Journal of the ACM, vol. 45, no. 4, pages 653–750, July 1998.
 D. Ron, Y. Singer, and N. Tishby, The Power of Amnesia: Learning Probabilistic Automata with Variable Memory Length.  Machine Learning, vol. 25, no. 2, pages 117–149, 1996.

References

External links
Home page of Dana Ron

1964 births
Living people
Israeli computer scientists
Theoretical computer scientists
Israeli women computer scientists
Academic staff of Tel Aviv University